Kai Peterson (stage name), (born 1962 née Kai-Peter Sauer in Hannover, Lower Saxony, Germany) is an actor, voice talent, music producer, composer, lyricist and singer in the genres musical theater, Jazz, Soul and Funk. He took his stage name Kai Peterson in 1989, but since his marriage with Karen Henry his legal name is Kai-Peter Henry.

personal life 
Kai Peterson is the first of two children born to Peter Petrel und Hede-Birgit. He has two sisters.
Since 1990 he is living in Vienna/Austria with his wife and two sons.

professional life 
Kai Peterson is on the board of the austrian voice talent association VOICE, a board member of the austrian musicians guild and one of the artists works council at the VBW.

actor 
Kai Peterson appeared on stage in the following theater productions, revues, events and concerts:

 1979–80
THE FARMER AS MILLIONAIRE (Raimund) – "Wurzel" – FWS  Hannover
THE RHINOCEROSES (E.Unesco) – "Der Ältere Herr" – FWS Hannover

 1982 – 86
Club & Tour with the bands...
EXIT 55
COMMUNICATION
JOY & PAIN
FUN KEY B.
BODY & SOUL
 1987
FANTASTICO (R.A.I.) – "Corista" – THEATRO D. VICTORIE ROMA
ARGENT DE POCHE (Jazz Band) – FONCLEA ROMA
 1988
LOVE OR WAR (director: Lothar Höfgen) – State Opera Hannover
 1989
QUASIMODO (dir.: Maria Caleita) – „Phöbus", Münchener Schauspielbühne /Tour Germany-Austria-Switzerland
 1990–92
WEST SIDE STORY (dir.: Anna Vaughn) – „Diesel/Tony", County Theatre Innsbruck
FREUDIANA (dir.: Peter Weck) – „ERIK / 9. Member", Theater an der Wien
BEST OF MUSICALS (dir.: Kim Duddy) – member since 1990
 1992
ROCKY HORROR SHOW (dir.: Alexander Goebel) – „Rocky", Summerstock Amstetten
BEST OF MUSICALS (dir.: Kim Duddy) – member since 1990
 1993
MUSICAL ? ‘OH MY GOD !’ (dir.: A. Goebel) – Musical Revue – Applaus Theater + Concert Hall Vienna
TRAUMMANIA (dir.: Peter Lauscher) – „Tamino", County Theatre Mecklenburg / ORF / NDR
20th BIRTHDAY CELEBRATION ROCKY HORROR SHOW (d.:A.Goebel) – „Rocky", Raimund Theater Wien
ELISABETH (dir.: Harry Kupfer) – „Count Schwarzenberg", Theater an der Wien
BEST OF MUSICALS (dir.: Kim Duddy) – member since 1990
 1994
ELISABETH (Reg./dir.: Harry Kupfer) – „Count Schwarzenberg", Theater an der Wien
TRAUMMANIA (Reg./dir.: Peter Lauscher) – „Tamino", Landestheater/County Theatre Mecklenburg / ORF / NDR
AN EVE. IN MAJOR AND MINOR (R./d.:Kai Peterson) – Personality Show with guests, Residenztheater Vienna
WEST SIDE STORY (R./d.: Heinz Ehrenfreund) – „Tony", Summerstock Amstetten
SCHNEWITTCHEN Kindermusical / SNOW WHITE kidsmusical (Peter Rapp) – „Prince Charming", Akzent Theater Wien
BEST OF MUSICALS (Reg./dir.: Kim Duddy) – member since 1990
BLUE MOON EXPERIENCE „SLEEPWALKING" – Multi Media Show (for MERCEDES, IBM, McDONALDS, VW-SKODA a.o.)
 1995
TRAUMMANIA (dir.: Peter Lauscher) – „Tamino", County Theatre Mecklenburg / ORF / NDR
SNOW WHITE kidsmusical (Peter Rapp) – „Prince Charming", Akzent Theater Wien
BEST OF MUSICALS (dir.: Kim Duddy) – member since 1990
BLUE MOON EXPERIENCE „SLEEPWALKING" – Multi Media Show (or MERCEDES, IBM, McDONALDS, VW-SKODA a.o.)
CASINO X-MAS SHOW (dir.: Ruppert Henning) – Revue mit versch. Gästen/ revue with various guests, Casino Baden
 1996 + 1997
BLUE MOON EXPERIENCE „SLEEPWALKING" – Multi Media Show (for MERCEDES, IBM, McDONALDS, VW-SKODA a.o..)
BEST OF MUSICALS (dir.: Kim Duddy) – member since 1990
BLONDEL (dir.: Werner Sobotka) – „Richard the lionhearted", Summerstock Amstetten
VIENNA MUSICAL PROJECT SOUTH AMERICAN TOUR (dir.: K. Peterson), MS Arkona
BEST OF MUSICALS (Reg./dir.: Kim Duddy) – Mitglied/member seit/since 1990
DIE NACHT DER MUSICALS /BROADWAY MUSICAL NIGHT (A.+A. Diepold), musical revue tour production (Austria+Germany)
BLUE MOON EXPERIENCE „SLEEPWALKING" – Multi Media Show (Für/for MERCEDES, IBM, McDONALDS, VW-SKODA u.v.a.)
MAIN STREETs „KAMBÄCK TOUR" " – Club Tour AUSTRIA
 1998 + 1999
VIENNA MUSICAL PROJECT MEDITERANIAN CRUISE (Reg./dir.: K. Peterson), MS AZUR
MAIN STREETs „KAMBÄCK TOUR" " – Club Tour AUSTRIA
BEST OF MUSICALS (Reg./dir.: Kim Duddy) – Mitglied/member seit/since 1990
"DIE DREI VON DER TANKSTELLE" (R.:/d.:N. Büchel) – „Willi", Musical-theater Production of a twenties Movie, METROPOL WIEN
CARL ORFFs "BERNAUERIN" (R./d.: T. Langhoff) – „Announcer", VOLKSOPER WIEN
BEST OF MUSICALS (Reg./dir.: Kim Duddy) – Mitglied/member seit/since 1990
MAIN STREETs  „WÖDHIZ OHNE KAPÖN" – a cappella comedy -Club tour Germany/Austria
 2000
MAIN STREETs  „WÖDHITS. OHNE KAPÖN" – a cappella comedy -Club tour Germany/Austria
THE HUNCHBACK OF NOTRE DAME (dir.:R. Diepold) – "Quasimodo"- EUROPEAN TOUR
BEST OF MUSICALS (Reg./dir.: Kim Duddy) – Mitglied/member seit/since 1990
VIENNA MUSICAL COMPANY "Best of Andrew Lloyd Webber"(R.:/dir.: Dean Welterlen)   – Finkenstein Ruin
 "Double Density"(dir.: Felix DeRooy) – a cappella pop/multidea show – Tour, Netherlands-Germany
 2001
MONTEZUMA'S REVENGE "Double Density"(dir.: Felix DeRooy) – a cappella pop/multidea show – Tour, Netherlands-Germany-Austria
BEST OF MUSICALS (dir.: S. Ziegler) – Singer/Soloist – BURGARENA FINKENSTEIN
THE CHRYSTAL CHRISTMAS SHOW (d.:Andrew Morris) – "Engelbert" – CASINO BADEN
 2002
Cooking With Elvis by Lee Hall (dir. Harald Posch) – "Dad" – THEATER IN DER DRACHENGASSE WIEN
CHRISTMAS WITH FRIENDS (d.:Andrew Morris)  – "Kai" (the 4 Angels) – CASINO BADEN
THE BEST OF MUSICALS (d.: Herwig Gratzer) – "Soloist" – STADTHEATER KLAGENFURT
WAKE UP (d.: Phillippe Arlaud) – "2. Jeff/various" – RAIMUNDTHEATER WIEN
 2003 + 2004
WAKE UP (d.: Phillippe Arlaud) – "2. Jeff/various" – RAIMUNDTHEATER WIEN
A CHRISTMAS CAROL (d: Katja Thost-Hauser) – "Bob Crachit" – FORUM WIEN
 2005
ROMEO & JULIA (d.: Rheda Benteifour) – "Prince Of Verona / Lord Capulet / Lorenzo" – RAIMUNDTHEATER WIEN
THE 3 MUSKETEERS (d: Katja Thost-Hauser) – "Aramis" – SEELBACH
BEST OF MUSICALS – Singer/Soloist – BURGARENA FINKENSTEIN
A CHRISTMAS CAROL (d: Katja Thost-Hauser) – "Bob Crachit" – FORUM WIEN
 2006
ROMEO & JULIA (d.: Rheda Benteifour) – " Lord Capulet alternate / Prince Of Verona / Lorenzo" – RAIMUNDTHEATER WIEN
BEST OF MUSICALS – Singer/Soloist – BURGARENA FINKENSTEIN
REBECCA (d.: Francesca Zambello) – " Judge Horridge/Jack Favell/Col. Julyan " – RAIMUNDTHEATER WIEN
 2007
REBECCA (d.: Francesca Zambello) – " Judge Horridge/Jack Favell/Col. Julyan " – RAIMUNDTHEATER WIEN
BEST OF MUSICALS (dir.: S. Ziegler) – Singer/Soloist – BURGARENA FINKENSTEIN
 2008
DIE ZOOGESCHICHTE/THE ZOOSTORY (d.:Reinfried Schiessler) – " Peter" – SCHUBERTTHEATER WIEN
REBECCA (d.: Francesca Zambello) – " Judge Horridge/Jack Favell/Col. Julyan " – RAIMUNDTHEATER WIEN
 2009
RUDOPLH – AFFAIRE MAYERLING (d.: DAVID LEVAUX) – "Moritz Szepps/Edward POW" – RAIMUNDTHEATER WIEN
 2010
RUDOPLH – AFFAIRE MAYERLING (dir.: DAVID LEVAUX) -"Moritz Szepps/Edward POW" – RAIMUNDTHEATER WIEN
ICH WAR NOCH NIEMALS IN NEW YORK (d.: Carline Bouwer) – "Axel/Captain/Ensemble" – RAIMUNDTHEATER WIEN
 2011 + 2012
ICH WAR NOCH NIEMALS IN NEW YORK (d.: Carline Bouwer) – "Axel/Captain/Ensemble" – RAIMUNDTHEATER WIEN
ICH WAR NOCH NIEMALS IN NEW YORK (d.: Carline Bouwer) – "Axel/Captain" – APOLLO THEATER STUTTGART

discography

producer 
(album – artist – label)
 Mix It Up (Kai Peterson) – Co-Producer DOUBLE YOU REC
 Go with the Flow Of Time (Kai Peterson) – Co-Producer DOUBLE YOU REC.
 Vienna BLUES Vol.1 (various) – Producer SOUL MADE PRODUCTIONS
 Slide (Cedric) – Producer SOUL MADE PRODUCTIONS
 Wödhits.Ohne Kapö'n (Main Street) – Producer SOUL MADE PRODUCTIONS
 A Cappella (Main Street) – Producer SOUL MADE PRODUCTIONS
 Double Density Live "Ambivalence" (Montezuma's Revenge) – Producer MULTIDISK
 Deep in Your Soul (Mark Janicello) – Producer MUSICA
 I glaub des kannst vagessn (Menschenfreund) – Producer SOUL MADE PRODUCTIONS
 Mehr als Jedes Wort (Thomas Borchert) Executive Producer SOUL MADE PRODUCTIONS
 Ruthless Lovesongs (Thomas Borchert) – Producer SOUL MADE PRODUCTIONS
 thomas' tierische themen (Thomas Borchert) – Producer SOUL MADE PRODUCTIONS
 Deep in Your Soul:::Sundance Music:::Crossover Jazz 2 (Peter Petrel) – Executive Producer SOUL MADE PRODUCTIONS
 DeLuxe (Thomas Borchert) – Producer (soul-made.com)
 I.V. (International Victim) – Executive Producer SOUL MADE PRODUCTIONS
 A Man Like Me (Alvin Le-Bass) – Producer SOUL MADE PRODUCTIONS
 Strictly Musical – live (Thomas Borchert) – Producer SOUL MADE PRODUCTIONS
 Mastermind (Kai Peterson) – Producer SOUL MADE PRODUCTIONS

singer 
(album – artist – label)
 "Mastermind" – EXIT 55 – Exit 55
 "Man at the Bus Stop" – QUIET FORCE- Peppermint Park Records
 "Love Or War" – FUN KEY B. – Peppermint Park Rec.
 "FREUDIANA – DEUITSCHE ORIGINAL AUFNAHME" – EMI-ELECTROLA
 "Mix It Up" – KAI PETERSON – Double You Rec.
 "Stay With Me" – MAIN STREET – Thema Rec.
 "Go with the Flow Of Time" – KAI PETERSON- Double You Rec.
 "The Best Of Musicals" – VIENNA MUSICAL COMPANY – Double You Rec.
 "Highlights aus Film und Musicals" – BLUE MOON EXPERIENCE – PG Rec.
 "So They Say/Vienna BLUES Vol.1" – THOMAS BORCHERT & KAI PETERSON – SOUL MADE PRODUCTIONS
 "Theme Song/SANTA CLAUS X -mas Musical" mit/with SANDRA PIRES – Gabriel Rec.
 "A Cappella" – MAIN STREET – SOUL MADE PRODUCTIONS
 "DIE DREI VON DER TANKSTELLE" – Musical Original Aufnahme – BMG
 "Wödhits. Ohne Kapö'n" – MAIN STREET – SOUL MADE PRODUCTIONS
 "Double Density" – MONTEZUMA'S REVENGE – Double Density – Zuma Records
 "Here I Am" – SANDRA PIRES – BMG-AUSTRIA
 "Moment Of Glory" – SCORPIONS – Moment of Glory – EMI London-Classics
 "Atemlos" – ATEMLOS – EDEL
 "Diverse" V.S.O.P. – DINO
 "Diverse" – LEANDRO – EDEL
 "WAKE UP – Original Cast Recording" – BMG
 "Borchert DeLuxe" – THOMAS BORCHERT – SOUL MADE PRODUCTIONS
 "ROMEO & JULIA – Original German Cast Recording" – Hit Squad/BMG
 "REBECCA – Original Cast Recording" – Hit Squad/BMG
 "A Little Bit Of Hope" – KAI PETERSON & THE RENS NEWLAND MIXTET – jive music Austria
 "A Man Like Me" – ALVIN LE-BASS – SOUL MADE PRODUCTIONS
 "Mastermind" – KAI PETERSON and BIG BAND – SOUL MADE PRODUCTIONS

External links 
 official Homepage
 profile on MySpace.com
 
 VOICE official Homepage

1962 births
Living people
German male stage actors
German male singers
German lyricists
German male voice actors
German male writers